Ulises Alfredo Castillo Soto (born 5 March 1992) is a Mexican road cyclist, who currently rides for the Denver Disruptors.

Major results

2014
 Vuelta a Michoacán
1st Stages 1 & 5
2015
 1st  Overall Tour de Murrieta
1st Stage 1 (ITT)
 2nd Overall Vuelta a Michoacán
2016
 1st  Overall Tour de Murrieta
 Sea Otter Classic
1st Road race
1st Criterium
 1st Stage 4 Redlands Bicycle Classic
 5th Road race, Pan American Road Championships
 5th Road race, National Road Championships
2017
 3rd Overall Redlands Bicycle Classic
 3rd Overall Grand Prix Cycliste de Saguenay
 4th Road race, National Road Championships
 6th Overall Tour of Xingtai
2018
 2nd Road race, National Road Championships
 2nd Overall Tour of Xingtai
 2nd Overall San Dimas Stage Race
1st Stage 2
2019
 1st Winston-Salem Cycling Classic
 2nd Road race, National Road Championships
2020
 National Road Championships
1st  Road race
2nd Time trial
2021
 2nd Overall Tour of Mevlana
 5th Grand Prix Gazipaşa
 8th Grand Prix Gündoğmuş
 9th Grand Prix Alanya

References

External links 
 

1992 births
Living people
Mexican male cyclists
Sportspeople from Los Mochis